The following is a list of educational institutions in the Scarborough district of the city of Toronto, Ontario, Canada. The Toronto school boards provide public elementary and secondary education. The boards operate as either English or French first language school boards, and as either secular or separate school boards. In addition to elementary and secondary schools, Scarborough is also home to two public post-secondary institutions, and several private vocational schools.

Post-secondary institutions
Scarborough is home to two public post-secondary institutions, the University of Toronto Scarborough, and Centennial College. The University of Toronto Scarborough is a satellite campus of the University of Toronto, based in Downtown Toronto. Centennial College is a public college that operates several campuses in Scarborough, and other areas of Toronto.

In addition to public post-secondary institutions, Scarborough is home to several private vocational schools, including the Oxford College of Arts, Business and Technology.

Secondary schools
Secondary schools in Scarborough typically offer schooling for students from Grades 9 to 12. Three of the four Toronto-based public school boards operate secondary schools in Scarborough, Conseil scolaire catholique MonAvenir, Toronto Catholic District School Board (TCDSB), and the Toronto District School Board. MonAvenir and TCDSB operate as separate school boards, the former being a French first language school board, the latter being English. TDSB operates as a secular English first language school board. The secular  French first language school board, Conseil scolaire Viamonde (CSV) is the only Toronto-based school board that does not operate a secondary school in the district, with CSV secondary students attending secondary schools located in the adjacent districts of  North York, or Old Toronto.

In addition to standard secondary schools, TDSB also operate a number of adult schools in Scarborough, including the Gooderham Learning Centre, McGriskin Centre, and the Scarborough Centre for Alternative Studies.

The following is a list of public secondary schools in Scarborough,

Defunct or holding schools

Elementary schools
All four Toronto-based public school boards operate institutions in Scarborough that provide elementary education. Most elementary schools in Scarborough provides schooling from Junior Kindergarten to Grade 8. However, the TDSB operates several elementary institutions, known as junior public schools, that provide schooling for students from Junior Kindergarten to Grades 5 or 6, as well as senior public schools, which offers schooling for students from Grades 6/7 to 8. TDSB elementary schools that are called public schools typically provide schooling from Junior Kindergarten to Grade 8.

Elementary institutions in Scarborough that are operated by the TCDSB are typically called Catholic schools (although some TCDSB institutions also use the term academy). Elementary schools operated by CSV are named école élémentaire (although one elementary school in Scarborough uses the term académie), whereas schools operated by the MonAvenir are known as école élémentaire catholique.

The following is a list of public elementary schools in Scarborough,

Defunct or holding schools

Notes

See also
 Education in Toronto
 List of educational institutions in Etobicoke
 List of schools of the Conseil scolaire Viamonde
 List of schools of the Conseil scolaire catholique MonAvenir
 List of schools in the Toronto Catholic District School Board
 List of schools in the Toronto District School Board

Education in Scarborough
Scarborough